Middletown Public School District or Middletown Public Schools may refer to:
 Middletown Public Schools (Connecticut)
 Middletown Public Schools (Rhode Island)
 Middletown Township Public School District, New Jersey